The Hollywood Music in Media Award for Best Original Score in an Animated Film is one of the awards given annually to people working in the motion picture industry by the Hollywood Music in Media Awards (HMMA). It is presented to the composers who have composed the best "original" score, written specifically for an animated motion picture. The award was first given in 2014, during the fifth annual awards.

Winners and nominees

2010s

2020s

Multiple winners
2 wins
Alexandre Desplat
John Powell

Multiple nominations
4 nominations
Michael Giacchino

3 nominations
Jeff Danna
Mychael Danna
Mark Mothersbaugh
Heitor Pereira

2 nominations
Lorne Balfe
Christophe Beck
Alexandre Desplat
John Powell
Hans Zimmer

References

Best Score in an Animated Film
Film awards for best score
Awards established in 2014